Sankt Kathrein am Offenegg is a municipality in the district of Weiz in the Austrian state of Styria.

Geography
The municipality lies on the eastern edge of the Passail basin in the Graz hills.

References

Cities and towns in Weiz District
Graz Highlands